Thomas & Betts Manufacturing Ltd v Harding [1980] IRLR 255 is a UK labour law case, concerning redundancy.

Facts
Ms Harding was a packer, and also worked on a production line. The production line was closed and she was dismissed for redundancy. She claimed there was still work for packers, and if needed, one who had not worked so long should be dismissed instead, so the dismissal was unfair.

Judgment
Court of Appeal upheld the Tribunal’s decision that the dismissal was unfair.

Notes

United Kingdom labour case law
1980 in British law
1980 in case law
Court of Appeal (England and Wales) cases